Marcelo Tomé De Souza (born 21 April 1969) is a Brazilian footballer, who played as a defender for South Korean K-League side FC Seoul.

He only played one season in FC Seoul and left team.

References

External links
 

1969 births
Living people
Association football defenders
Brazilian footballers
Brazilian expatriate footballers
K League 1 players
FC Seoul players
Expatriate footballers in South Korea
Brazilian expatriate sportspeople in South Korea